This is a list of multilingual Indian films. The majority of films listed have been shot simultaneously alongside each other as a part of the same project—rather than being remade or dubbed at a later date. Largest number of bilinguals have been made between Telugu and Tamil Languages.

Bilingual films

Bengali and Hindi

Bengali and English

Bengali and Odia

English and Hindi

English and Malayalam

English and Tamil

English and Telugu

Hindi and Tamil

Hindi and Gujarati

Hindi and Marathi

Hindi and Punjabi

Hindi and Odia

Hindi and Telugu

Hindi and Russian

Hindi and Persian

Hindi and Turkish

Hindi and Kannada

Kannada and Tamil

Kannada and Telugu

Kannada and Malayalam

Malayalam and Arabic

Malayalam and Tamil

Malayalam and Telugu

Odia and Telugu

Tamil and Telugu

Trilingual films

Partially reshot films

See also
 Pan-Indian film
 Multiple-language version
 List of longest films in India

References

Multi
Multilingual films